The 2013 Drake Bulldogs football team represented Drake University as member of the Pioneer Football League (PFL) during the 2013 NCAA Division I FCS football season. Led by sixth-year head coach Chris Creighton, the Bulldogs compiled and overall record of 6–5 with a mark of 5–3 in conference play, tying for fourth place in the PFL. The team played home games at Drake Stadium in Des Moines, Iowa.

At the end of the season, Creighton resigned to become the head football coach at Eastern Michigan University.

Schedule

References

External links
 2013 Drake Football Media Guide

Drake
Drake Bulldogs football seasons
Drake Bulldogs football